Georgette Rejewski (12 February 1910 – 21 February 2014) was a Belgian-born Dutch actress.

Selected filmography
 Any Day Now (1976)
 Dokter Vlimmen (1977) - Overbuurvrouw
 A Bridge Too Far (1977) - Elderly Dutch Couple
 Twee vorstinnen en een vorst (1981) - Blind vrouwtje
 Another Mother (1996) - Moeder van Marie

See also
 List of centenarians (actors, filmmakers and entertainers)

References

External links

1910 births
2014 deaths
20th-century Dutch actresses
21st-century Dutch actresses
Dutch film actresses
Actors from Antwerp
Dutch centenarians
Women centenarians